Live in Concert may refer to:

Albums
Live in Concert (2 Live Crew album), 1990
Live in Concert (Freda Payne album), 1999
Live in Concert (Gin Blossoms album), 2009
Live in Concert (The Jesus and Mary Chain album), 2003
Live in Concert (Lou Reed album), originally Live in Italy, 1984
Live in Concert (Manafest album), 2011
Live in Concert (Martina McBride album), 2008
Live in Concert (Melbourne Welsh Male Choir album), 2002
Live in Concert (Najwa Karam album), 2001
Live in Concert (Natalie Merchant album), 1999
Live in Concert (Ray Charles album), 1965
Live in Concert (Sad Café album), 1981
Live in Concert 1972/73, by Deep Purple, 2005
Live in Concert 1977 & 1979, by Bad Company, 2016
Live in Concert 1979, by Amanda Lear, 1980
Live in Concert 1998, by Bootsy Collins, 1998
Live in Concert 2006, by Barbra Streisand, 2007
Live in Concert 2010, by Dizzy Mizz Lizzy, 2010
Live in Concert! Greatest Hits and More, by the Smithereens, 2008
Wanted: Live in Concert, a comedy album by Richard Pryor, 1978
Live in Concert November 4th, 2001, by Eric's Trip, 2001

EPs
Live in Concert (EP), by Wiz Khalifa and Currensy, 2013
Live in Concert, by Lorde, 2013

Film and video
Live in Concert (video), by Cher, 1999
Richard Pryor: Live in Concert, a 1979 stand-up comedy film by Richard Pryor

Radio
Live in Concert, now Radio 3 in Concert, a BBC Radio 3 classical music programme